Scotland is a city in Archer County in the U.S. state of Texas. It is part of the Wichita Falls, Texas Metropolitan Statistical Area. The population was 501 at the 2010 census. The town is named for its founder, Henry J. Scott.

Geography

Scotland is located in eastern Archer County at  (33.642195, –98.448340), south of the Little Wichita River. The city limits extend east as far as Lake Arrowhead, a reservoir on the Little Wichita. U.S. Route 281 passes through the city, leading north  to Wichita Falls and south  to Jacksboro.

Climate

The climate in this area is characterized by hot, humid summers and generally mild to cool winters.  According to the Köppen Climate Classification system, Scotland has a humid subtropical climate, abbreviated "Cfa" on climate maps.

Demographics

As of the census of 2000, there were 438 people, 160 households, and 116 families residing in the city. The population density was 39.1 people per square mile (15.1/km). There were 173 housing units at an average density of 15.4/sq mi (6.0/km). The racial makeup of the city was 95.21% White, 2.74% from other races, and 2.05% from two or more races. Hispanic or Latino of any race were 8.68% of the population.

There were 160 households, out of which 41.3% had children under the age of 18 living with them, 65.6% were married couples living together, 3.8% had a female householder with no husband present, and 27.5% were non-families. 25.6% of all households were made up of individuals, and 14.4% had someone living alone who was 65 years of age or older. The average household size was 2.74 and the average family size was 3.35.

In the city, the population was spread out, with 33.8% under the age of 18, 5.3% from 18 to 24, 27.4% from 25 to 44, 20.1% from 45 to 64, and 13.5% who were 65 years of age or older. The median age was 34 years. For every 100 females, there were 102.8 males. For every 100 females age 18 and over, there were 104.2 males.

The median income for a household in the city was $37,083, and the median income for a family was $41,667. Males had a median income of $32,045 versus $21,875 for females. The per capita income for the city was $15,406. About 3.0% of families and 3.4% of the population were below the poverty line, including 1.3% of those under age 18 and 12.3% of those age 65 or over.

Education
Scotland is split in half between Windthorst Independent School District and Archer City Independent School District. Small portions belong to the Henrietta Independent School District.

References

External links

 Handbook of Texas Online article about Scotland

Cities in Archer County, Texas
Cities in Texas
Wichita Falls metropolitan area